MÄR is a Japanese manga written and illustrated by Nobuyuki Anzai. The series was serialized in Shogakukan's Weekly Shōnen Sunday from January 22, 2003 to July 19, 2006. The series was compiled in fifteen tankōbon volumes published by Shogakukan between May 17, 2003 and August 11, 2006. A sequel entitled MÄR Omega, written by Anzai but illustrated by Kōichirō Hoshino, was published in Weekly Shōnen Sunday from July 26, 2006 and June 27, 2007. It was compiled in four tankōbon volumes published between December 16, 2006 and August 10, 2007.

In North America, the series was licensed for an English language release by Viz Media. The first volume was released on May 3, 2005 and the fifteenth on September 18, 2007.

Volume listing

MÄR

MÄR Omega

References

MÄR
MAR